Ropicomimus is a genus of beetles in the family Cerambycidae, containing the following species:

 Ropicomimus papuanus Breuning, 1940
 Ropicomimus ruber Breuning, 1939
 Ropicomimus vitticollis Breuning, 1953

References

Apomecynini